Mohammadiyeh (also Romanized as Moḩammadīyeh) is a city and capital of Mohammadiyeh District, Alborz County, Qazvin Province, Iran. At the 2006 census its population was 41,766, in 10,904 families.  The city was formed by a union of two villages: Zibashahr (Zībāshahr) and Bavers (Bāvers).

References 

Alborz County
Cities in Qazvin Province